Alexei Fyodorovich Lvov (Russian: Алексей Фёдорович Львов) ( – ) was a Russian composer. He is known for his work — the composition of the Imperial Russian National Anthem Bozhe, tsarya khrani (also known as God Save the Tsar). He wrote the opera Undine in 1846. He was entombed in the Pažaislis Monastery, Kaunas (Lithuania).

Biography
Lvov was born into a family which was keenly interested in music. He was the son of Feodor Petrovich Lvov, who was Maestro of the Imperial Chapel in St Petersburg from 1826 to 1836 (having succeeded Bortnianskij). Lvov codified the traditional Russian liturgical musical style called "Obikhod," which is the standard repertory of most Russian Orthodox churches in the world. It is a simple style. These melodies were later edited and improved by Bakhmetev.

Alexei Fyodorovich began violin lessons at a very young age and performed regularly in concerts given at his home: for instance, at 9 he was the soloist in a performance of a violin concerto by Viotti. Although he had a number of teachers in his youth, from the age of 19 onwards he began to study independently, seeking to develop his own personal style through careful attention to the works of such celebrated violinists as Corelli, Tartini, Viotti, Kreutzer and Rode. He nevertheless continued to study composition formally under the supervision of I. G. Miller (who was also one of the teachers of Glinka).

Outside the world of music, his general education had a technical emphasis. In 1818, he completed his studies at the Institute of Communications, and embarked on a career as a civil engineer in the Imperial Army, eventually attaining the rank of general. In 1828, he was appointed Aide-de-camp to Tsar Nicholas I.

Lvov formed a string quartet in St Petersburg, and organised weekly concerts at his private residence, which were attended by members of high society. At these concerts it was quite usual for there to be guest performances by distinguished musicians who were visiting the Russian capital; among these were Liszt, Robert and Clara Schumann, and Berlioz. His quartet undertook a number of tours in Europe, where Lvov was able to perform to public audiences (in his home country he was able to play only to private audiences owing to his elevated social rank). He also counted Mendelssohn, Meyerbeer and Spontini amongst his personal friends.

In 1837, Lvov succeeded his father as Maestro of the Imperial Chapel, remaining in the position until 1861. In 1850, he founded the Russian Concert Society (Русское концертное общество), which was among the pioneers of symphonic concerts in Russia. In 1867, with the onset of deafness, he was obliged to withdraw from musical activity.

As a composer, Lvov's style was eclectic. He combined the traditions of Russian musical culture with strong Italian and (especially) German influences.

Lvov was married, and had a son and two daughters.

Musical Compositions
Lvov's musical output includes the following:

the Former Regional Anthem of Pennsylvania «Hail, Pennsylvania!»
the Russian Imperial Anthem «Боже, Царя храни»
Religious works, e.g. «Иже херувимы» and «Вечери Твоея тайныя» ("Of Thy Mystical Supper")
Bianca and Gualtiero («Бианка и Гвальтьеро»), (opera), 1844
Undina («Ундина») (opera), 1847. The libretto, by Vladimir Alexandrovich Sollogub, was based on Vasily Zhukovsky's translation of Friedrich de la Motte Fouqué's Ondine. (The same libretto was later used by Tchaikovsky.) Lvov's Undina was performed in St Petersburg in 1848.
the operettas «Русский мужичок» and Barbara («Варвара»).
Concerto for Violin and Orchestra
revised version of Pergolesi's Stabat Mater, for soloists, chorus and orchestra
24 Caprices for Violin (24 каприса)
Dramatic Fantasy for violin and cello (an idea which was given to him by Meyerbeer). (Драматическая фантазия для скрипки и виолончели)

Other publications
These include:

 A Free and Asymmetric Rhythm («О свободном и несимметричном ритме») (this is a work which examines and discusses Old Slavonic religious chants) (1858)
 A Beginner’s Guide to the Violin, with 24 musical examples («Советы начинающему играть на скрипке с 24 музыкальными примерами») (in collaboration with V. Odoevskij) (circa 1859/1860).

Notes

External links

1799 births
1870 deaths
Russian Romantic composers
Russian male classical composers
Rurikids
19th-century classical composers
National anthem writers
19th-century male musicians
Privy Councillor (Russian Empire)